The Uganda Olympic Committee (IOC code: UGA) is the National Olympic Committee representing Uganda. It was created in 1950 and officially recognised by the International Olympic Committee in 1956.

Presidents of Committee

 1950–1958 – Richard Posnett
 1971–2009 – Francis Nyangweso
 2009–2012 – Roger Hans Ddungu
 2013–present – William Frederick Blick

See also
Uganda at the Olympics
Uganda at the Commonwealth Games

References

Uganda
Uganda
 
Sports governing bodies in Uganda